Park Guy-lim (born 27 February 1999) is a South Korean ski jumper. Park competed at the 2018 Winter Olympics for South Korea.

References

External links

South Korean female ski jumpers
Sportspeople from Gangwon Province, South Korea
1999 births
Living people
Ski jumpers at the 2018 Winter Olympics
Olympic ski jumpers of South Korea